Consort Chen may refer to:

Imperial consorts with the surname Chen
Chen Jiao (166 BC?–110 BC?), wife of Emperor Wu of Han
Lady Chen (130 - 175), mother of Emperor Zhi of Han
Chen Guinü (died 390), concubine of Emperor Xiaowu of Jin
Chen Miaodeng ( 440s), concubine of Liu Yu (Emperor Ming of Liu Song)
Consort Chen Farong ( 460s–470s), concubine of Liu Yu (Emperor Ming of Liu Song)
Chen Yueyi (565?–650?), wife of Yuwen Yun (Emperor Xuan of Northern Zhou)
Consort Chen (Sui dynasty) (577–605), concubine of Emperor Wen of Sui
Chen Jinfeng (893–935), wife of Wang Yanjun (Emperor Huizong of Min)
Empress Chen (Jiajing) (1508–1528), wife of the Jiajing Emperor
Empress Chen (Longqing) (died 1596), wife of the Longqing Emperor
Consort Fang (died 1801), concubine of the Qianlong Emperor
Dowager Noble Consort Wan (1717–1807), concubine of the Qianlong Emperor

Imperial consorts with the title Consort Chen
Consort Li (Zhenzong) (987–1032), concubine of Emperor Zhenzong of Song, known as Consort Chen in 1032
Consort Chen (Yingzong) (1431–1467), concubine of Emperor Yingzong of Ming, known as Consort Chen after 1457
Harjol (1609–1641), concubine of Hong Taiji, known as Consort Chen after 1636

See also
Consort Zhen (1876–1900), consort of the Guangxu Emperor
Lady Zhen (183–221), wife of Cao Pi (Emperor Wen of Wei)
Consort Cheng (disambiguation)